Viettesia bicolor is a moth in the subfamily Arctiinae. It was described by Hervé de Toulgoët in 1980. It is found on the Comoros in the Indian Ocean.

References

Moths described in 1980
Lithosiini